The Gambler is a 1919 German silent film directed by Willy Zeyn and starring Käthe Haack and Heinrich Peer.

Cast
In alphabetical order

References

Bibliography

External links

1919 films
Films of the Weimar Republic
German silent feature films
Films directed by Willy Zeyn
German black-and-white films
Films based on German novels
1910s German films